"Love on Me" is a song by Swedish electronic music duo Galantis and Australian DJ Hook n Sling, featuring uncredited vocals of English singer-songwriter Laura White. It was released on 30 September 2016.

Music video
A music video, directed by Dano Cerny, was released to YouTube on 4 October 2016. It was filmed at the Buddhist temples Wat Tham Sue (วัดถ้ำเสือ; [th]) and Wat Tham Khao Noi (วัดถ้ำเขาน้อย; [th]) in Kanchanaburi province, Thailand and features choreographers dressed up as Tibetan monks in bright-colored robes performing choreographed dance sequences.

Track listing

Charts

Weekly charts

Year-end charts

Certifications

References

2016 singles
2016 songs
Galantis songs
Warner Music Group singles
Song recordings produced by Henrik Jonback
Songs written by Richard Boardman
Songs written by Cathy Dennis
Songs written by Christian Karlsson (DJ)
Songs written by Henrik Jonback
Songs written by Sarah Blanchard
Songs written by Style of Eye
Songs written by Svidden
Songs written by Laura White